Ricardo Araújo may refer to:
Ricardo Araujo (musician) (born 1978), Colombian musician
Ricardo Araújo (footballer, born 1998), Portuguese footballer who plays as a defender